Nathalie Déry (born June 8, 1976) is a Canadian ice hockey coach, retired player, and high school teacher. Déry is an assistant coach for Les Canadiennes de Montreal, the team she played for as a defender before retiring in 2012.

Playing career

From 2002 to 2006, Déry played for the Quebec Avalanche of the National Women's Hockey League, and then for the Montreal Axion for the 2006–07 season.

After the NWHL disbanded in 2007, Déry joined for the Montreal Stars of the Canadian Women's Hockey League. With the Stars, she won three Clarkson Cups (2009, 2011, and 2012). She retired from playing in 2012.

Coaching career

For four years, Déry was a coach for the Concordia Stingers women's hockey team.

After retiring from playing for the team in 2012, Déry joined the Montreal Stars as an assistant coach.

Personal life

As of 2012, Déry is a vice-principal and former physical education teacher at École Secondaire de Viau in Montreal.

References

External links

1976 births
Living people
Canadian women's ice hockey defencemen
Clarkson Cup champions
Ice hockey people from Quebec
Les Canadiennes de Montreal players